KTOX (1340 AM) is a radio station broadcasting a Talk/Personality format. Licensed to Needles, California, United States, the station serves the Laughlin, Bullhead City, Fort Mohave, Topock and Kingman areas. The station is currently owned by Rubin Broadcasting, Inc., and features programming from Premiere Networks, Salem Radio Network and Westwood One. KTOX carries a mix of political, variety, and sports programs including Free Talk Live, Alex Jones, Hear It Now, and Coast to Coast AM.

References

External links
Rubin Broadcasting Radio Stations
KTOX website

TOX
News and talk radio stations in the United States
Radio stations established in 1952